Othmar Russ (born 5 November 1952) is an Austrian ice hockey player. He competed in the men's tournament at the 1976 Winter Olympics.

References

1952 births
Living people
Olympic ice hockey players of Austria
Ice hockey players at the 1976 Winter Olympics
People from Graz-Umgebung District
Sportspeople from Styria